Chaandan Mein is the third studio album by Indian fusion band Kailasa, released in June 2009 by Sony Music.

Track listing
All songs written by Kailash Kher and music by Kailash Kher, Paresh Kamath & Naresh Kamath

Personnel

 Paresh Kamath – Guitars, Keyboards, Backing Vocals
 Naresh Kamath – Bass, Keyboards, Backing Vocals
 Kurt Peters – Drums, Percussions
 Sanket Athale – Percussions, Vocal Percussions, Backing Vocals
 Sankarshan Kini – Violin, Mandolin

Additional musicians
 Rinku Rajput – Keyboards
 Tapas Roy – Rabab, Saz, Mandolin, Oud, Santoor
 Sunil Das – Sitar
 Feroze Shah – Harmonium
 Kutle Khan – Mor Chang, Bagal Bacchha, Kartal
 Naveen Kumar – Flutes
 Ashwin Srinivasan – Flutes
 Kawa Brass Band – Brass section

2009 albums
Kailasa (band) albums